Limnonectes is a genus of fork-tongued frogs of about 75 known species, but new ones are still being described occasionally. They are collectively known as fanged frogs because they tend to have unusually large teeth, which are small or absent in other frogs.

Habitat
These frogs are found throughout East and Southeast Asia, most commonly near forest streams. Multiple species of Limnonectes may occupy the same area in harmony. Large-bodied species cluster around fast rivers, while smaller ones live among leaf-litter or on stream banks. The Indonesian island of Sulawesi is home to at least 15 species of this frog, only four of which have been formally described.

Lifecycle
Tadpoles of this genus have adapted to a variety of conditions. Most species (e.g. Blyth's river frog L. blythii or the fanged river frog L. macrodon) develop normally, with free-swimming tadpoles that eat food. The tadpoles of the corrugated frog (L. laticeps) are free-swimming but endotrophic, meaning they do not eat but live on stored yolk until metamorphosis into frogs. Before, L. limborgi was assumed to have direct development (eggs hatching as tiny, full-formed frogs), but more careful observations have showed it has free-swimming but endotrophic larvae; this probably applies to the closely related L. hascheanus, too. L. larvaepartus is the only known species of frog that gives live birth to tadpoles. Parental care is performed by males.

Species

 Limnonectes acanthi (Taylor, 1923) – Busuanga wart frog
 Limnonectes arathooni (Smith, 1927) – Djikoro wart frog; (Endangered)
 Limnonectes asperatus
 Limnonectes bannaensis Ye, Fei, Xie & Jiang, 2007
 Limnonectes beloncioi Herr, Vallejos, Meneses, Abraham, Otterholt, Siler, Rico & Brown, 2021 – Mindoro fanged frog
 Limnonectes blythii – Blyth's river frog, giant Asian river frog
 Limnonectes cintalubang (Matsui, Nishikawa & Eto, 2014)
 Limnonectes coffeatus Phimmachak, Sivongxay, Seateun, Yodthong, Rujirawan, Neang, Aowphol, and Stuart, 2018
 Limnonectes conspicillatus (Günther, 1872)
 Limnonectes dabanus
 Limnonectes dammermani – Dammerman's wart frog
 Limnonectes deinodon  Dehling, 2014
 Limnonectes diuatus – eastern Mindanao frog, Tagibo wart frog
 Limnonectes doriae – Burmese wart frog, Doria's frog, or red stream frog
 Limnonectes fastigatus Stuart, Schoen, Nelson, Maher, Neang, Rowley & McLeod, 2020
 Limnonectes ferneri
 Limnonectes finchi – Finch's wart frog
 Limnonectes fragilis
 Limnonectes fujianensis
 Limnonectes grunniens
 Limnonectes gyldenstolpei
 Limnonectes hascheanus (sometimes separated in Taylorana)
 Limnonectes heinrichi
 Limnonectes hikidai Matsui & Nishikawa, 2014
 Limnonectes ibanorum
 Limnonectes ingeri
 Limnonectes isanensis McLeod, Kelly, and Barley, 2012 
 Limnonectes jarujini Matsui et al., 2010
 Limnonectes kadarsani
 Limnonectes kenepaiensis
 Limnonectes khammonensis
 Limnonectes khasianus
 Limnonectes kiziriani Pham, Le, Ngo, Ziegler, and Nguyen, 2018 
 Limnonectes kohchangae
 Limnonectes kong Dehling and Dehling, 2017
 Limnonectes kuhlii – Kuhl's Creek frog, large-headed frog
 Limnonectes larvaepartus
 Limnonectes lauhachindai (Aowphol, Rujirawan, Taksintum, Chuaynkern & Stuart. 2015)
 Limnonectes leporinus – giant river frog
 Limnonectes leytensis – small disked frog, swamp frog
 Limnonectes limborgi
 Limnonectes liui (Yang, 1983)
 Limnonectes longchuanensis (Suwannapoom, Yuan, Sullivan & McLeod, 2016)
 Limnonectes macrocephalus – Luzon fanged frog
 Limnonectes macrodon (Duméril & Bibron, 1841) – fanged river frog, Javan giant frog, Malaya wart frog, stone creek frog
 Limnonectes macrognathus
 Limnonectes magnus (Stejneger, 1910) – giant Philippine frog, large swamp frog, Mindanao fanged frog
 Limnonectes malesianus – Malesian frog, peat swamp frog
 Limnonectes mawlyndipi
 Limnonectes megastomias McLeod, 2008
 Limnonectes micrixalus
 Limnonectes microdiscus
 Limnonectes microtympanum
 Limnonectes mocquardi (Mocquard, 1890)
 Limnonectes modestus
 Limnonectes namiyei – Namiye's frog
 Limnonectes nguyenorum
 Limnonectes nitidus
 Limnonectes palavanensis
 Limnonectes paramacrodon
 Limnonectes parvus – Philippine small-disked frog
 Limnonectes plicatellus
 Limnonectes poilani
 Limnonectes quangninhensis Pham, Le, Nguyen, Ziegler, Wu, and Nguyen, 2017
 Limnonectes rhacoda
 Limnonectes savan Phimmachak, Richards, Sivongxay, Seateun, Chuaynkern, Makchai, Som & Stuart, 2019
 Limnonectes selatan Matsui, Belabut, and Ahmad, 2014
 Limnonectes shompenorum
 Limnonectes sinuatodorsalis  Matsui, 2015
 Limnonectes sisikdagu McLeod, Horner, Husted, Barley, and Iskandar, 2011 
 Limnonectes taylori Matsui et al., 2010
 Limnonectes timorensis (Smith, 1927)
 Limnonectes tweediei
 Limnonectes utara Matsui, Belabut, and Ahmad, 2014
 Limnonectes visayanus – giant Visayan frog
 Limnonectes woodworthi – Woodworth's frog

Phylogeny

Pyron & Wiens (2011)
The following phylogeny of Limnonectes is from Pyron & Wiens (2011). 35 species are included. Limnonectes is a sister group of Nanorana.

Aowphol, et al. (2015)
The following Limnonectes phylogeny is from Aowphol, et al. (2015). 20 species are included.

McLeod, et al. (2015)
Below is a phylogeny of species within the L. kuhlii species complex (McLeod, et al. 2015). Limnonectes longchuanensis, Limnonectes hikidai, and Limnonectes cintalubang are also part of the L. kuhlii species complex.

References

 
Dicroglossidae
Amphibians of Asia
Amphibian genera
Taxa named by Leopold Fitzinger